Muller's snake or Müller's snake is a common name for several snakes and may refer to:

Micrelaps muelleri, native to the Middle East
Rhinoplocephalus bicolor, native to Australia